The 1938 NC State Wolfpack football team was an American football team that represented North Carolina State University as a member of the Southern Conference (SoCon) during the 1938 college football season. In its second season under head coach Williams Newton, the team compiled a 3–7–1 record (3–3–1 against SoCon opponents) and was outscored by a total of 100 to 59.

Schedule

References

NC State
NC State Wolfpack football seasons
NC State Wolfpack football